Tenuidactylus bogdanovi is a species of gecko, a lizard in the family Gekkonidae. The species is native to Central Asia.

Etymology
The specific name, bogdanovi, is in honor of Soviet herpetologist Oleg Pavlovich Bogdanov.

Geographic range
T. bogdanovi occurs naturally in Uzbekistan and southern Tajikistan. An introduced population of this species is known in South Ukraine, in the city of Odessa.

Habitat
It has also been found inside buildings.

Reproduction
T. bogdanovi is oviparous. Clutch size is one or two eggs.

References

Further reading
Chirikova MA, Amirekul KA (2021). "A new record of the Bogdanov's thin-toed gecko, Tenuidactylus bogdanovi (Sauria, Gekkonidae), in South Kazakhstan". Current Studies in Herpetology 21 (2): 151–154. (in Russian, with an sbstract in English).
Nazarov RA, Poyarkov NA (2013). "[Taxonomic revision of genus Tenuidactylus Szczerbak & Golubev, 1984 (Reptilia: Squamata: Gekkonidae) with description of new species from Central Asia]". [Zoological Journal ] 92 (11): 1312–1332. (Tenuidactylus bogdanovi, new species). (in Russian).

Tenuidactylus
Reptiles described in 2013